"One for Sorrow" is a traditional children's nursery rhyme about magpies. According to an old superstition, the number of magpies seen tells if one will have bad or good luck.

Lyrics
There is considerable variation in the lyrics used. A common modern version is:

A longer version of the rhyme recorded in Lancashire continues:

Origins

The rhyme has its origins in ornithomancy superstitions connected with magpies, considered a bird of ill omen in some cultures, and in Britain, at least as far back as the early sixteenth century. The rhyme was first recorded around 1780 in a note in John Brand's Observations on Popular Antiquities on Lincolnshire with the lyric:

One of the earliest versions to extend this was published, with variations, in Michael Aislabie Denham's Proverbs and Popular Saying of the Seasons (London, 1846):

On occasion, jackdaws, crows and other Corvidae are associated with the rhyme, particularly in America where magpies are less common. In eastern India, the erstwhile British colonial bastion, the common myna is the bird of association.

A version of the rhyme became familiar to many UK children when it became the theme tune of the children's TV show Magpie, which ran from 1968 to 1980. The popularity of this version is thought to have displaced the many regional versions that had previously existed.

Popular culture 
The name of the rock band Counting Crows derives from the rhyme, which is featured in the song "A Murder of One" on the band's debut album, August and Everything After.

The first track on Seanan McGuire's album Wicked Girls, also titled "Counting Crows", features a modified version of the rhyme.

The artist S. J. Tucker's song, "Ravens in the Library," from her album Mischief, utilizes the modern version of the rhyme as a chorus, and the rest of the verses relate to the rhyme in various ways.

David Dodds used the rhyme as the chorus for his song "Magpie"; it also included the lyric "Devil, Devil, I defy thee", having been inspired by an older woman he gave a lift to once in his new car. As a supposed counter-curse to the bad luck brought by witnessing a magpie, the woman would say the expression and spit whnever she saw a one during their journey. The English band The Unthanks recorded a version of this song on their 2015 album "Mount the Air".

Anthony Horowitz used the rhyme as the organizing scheme for the story-within-a-story in his 2016 novel Magpie Murders and in the subsequent television adaptation of the same name.

The American alternative rock band, The Innocence Mission, featured a song called "One for Sorrow, Two for Joy" on their 2003 release, Befriended. It was written and sung by Karen Peris.

The nursery rhyme's name was used for a book written by Mary Downing Hahn, One for Sorrow: A Ghost Story. The book additionally contains references to the nursery rhyme.

Notes

References

English nursery rhymes
English folk songs
English children's songs
Traditional children's songs
Songs about birds
Songs about luck
Birds in mythology